The Most Sacred Heart of Jesus is one of the most widely practised and well-known Catholic devotions, wherein the heart of Jesus is viewed as a symbol of "God's boundless and passionate love for mankind". This devotion to Christ is predominantly used in the Catholic Church, followed by high-church Anglicans, Lutherans and some Western Rite Orthodox. In the Latin Church, the liturgical Solemnity of the Most Sacred Heart of Jesus is celebrated the third Friday after Pentecost. The 12 promises of the Most Sacred Heart of Jesus are also extremely popular.

The devotion is especially concerned with what the church deems to be the long-suffering love and compassion of the heart of Christ towards humanity. The popularization of this devotion in its modern form is derived from a Roman Catholic nun from France, Margaret Mary Alacoque, who said she learned the devotion from Jesus during a series of apparitions to her between 1673 and 1675, and later, in the 19th century, from the mystical revelations of another Catholic nun in Portugal, Mary of the Divine Heart, a religious sister of the congregation of the Good Shepherd, who requested in the name of Christ that Pope Leo XIII consecrate the entire world to the Sacred Heart of Jesus. Predecessors to the modern devotion arose unmistakably in the Middle Ages in various facets of Catholic mysticism, particularly with Gertrude the Great.

Description

The Sacred Heart is often depicted in Christian art as a flaming heart shining with divine light, pierced by the lance-wound, encircled by the crown of thorns, surmounted by a cross, and bleeding. Sometimes, the image is shown shining within the bosom of Christ with his wounded hands pointing at the heart. The wounds and crown of thorns allude to the manner of Christ's passion, while the flames represent a furnace of ardent love.

History of the devotion

Early devotion
Historically, the devotion to the Sacred Heart is an outgrowth of devotion to what is believed to be Christ's sacred humanity. During the first ten centuries of Christianity, there is nothing to indicate that any worship was rendered to the wounded Heart of Jesus. The revival of religious life and the zealous activity of Bernard of Clairvaux and Francis of Assisi in the twelfth and thirteenth centuries, together with the enthusiasm of the Crusaders returning from the Holy Land, gave a rise to devotion to the Passion of Jesus Christ and particularly to practices in honour of the Sacred Wounds.

Devotion to the Sacred Heart developed out of the devotion to the Holy Wounds, in particular to the Sacred Wound in the side of Jesus. The first indications of devotion to the Sacred Heart are found in the eleventh and twelfth centuries in the fervent atmosphere of the Benedictine or Cistercian monasteries. It is impossible to say with certainty what were its first texts or who were its first devotees.

Bernard of Clairvaux ( 1153) said that the piercing of Christ's side revealed his goodness and the charity of his heart for humanity. The earliest known hymn to the Sacred Heart, is believed to have been written by the Norbertine Herman Joseph (d. 1241) of Cologne, Germany. The hymn begins: "I hail Thee kingly Heart most high."

From the 13th to the 16th centuries, the devotion was propagated but it did not seem to have been embellished. It was everywhere practised by individuals and by different religious congregations, such as the Franciscans, Dominicans, and Carthusians. Among the Franciscans the devotion to the Sacred Heart of Jesus has its champions in Bonaventure (d. 1274) in his  ("Mystic Vine") and John de la Verna. Bonaventure wrote: "Who is there who would not love this wounded heart? Who would not love in return Him, who loves so much?" It was, nevertheless, a private, individual devotion of the mystical order. Nothing of a general movement had been inaugurated, except for similarities found in the devotion to the Five Holy Wounds by the Franciscans, in which the wound in Jesus's heart figured most prominently.

Bonaventure's  (a part from which is the reading for the Divine Office on the Solemnity of the Sacred Heart) refers to the heart as the fountain from which God’s love poured into one's life:

Lutgarde
According to Thomas Merton, Lutgarde (d. 1246), a Cistercian mystic of Aywieres, Belgium, was one of the great precursors of the devotion to the Sacred Heart of Jesus. A contemporary of Francis of Assisi, she "entered upon the mystical life with a vision of the pierced Heart of the Saviour, and had concluded her mystical espousals with the Incarnate Word by an exchange of hearts with Him." Sources say that Christ came in a visitation to Lutgarde, offering her whatever gift of grace she should desire; she asked for a better grasp of Latin, that she might better understand the word of God and sing God's praise. Christ granted her request and Lutgarde's mind was flooded with the riches of psalms, antiphons, readings, and responsories. However, a painful emptiness persisted. She returned to Christ, asking to return his gift, and wondering if she might, just possibly, exchange it for another. "And for what would you exchange it?" Christ asked. "Lord, said Lutgarde, I would exchange it for your Heart." Christ then reached into Lutgarde and, removing her heart, replaced it with his own, at the same time hiding her heart within his breast.

Mechtilde
Mechtilde of Helfta (d. 1298) became an ardent devotee and promoter of Jesus' heart after it was the subject of many of her visions. The idea of hearing the heartbeat of God was very important to medieval saints who nurtured devotion to the Sacred Heart. Mechtilde reported that Jesus appeared to her in a vision and commanded her to love him ardently, and to honor his sacred heart in the Blessed Sacrament as much as possible. He gave her his heart as a pledge of his love, as a place of refuge during her life and as her consolation at the hour of her death. From this time Mechtilde had an extraordinary devotion for the Sacred Heart, and said that if she had to write down all the favors and all the blessings which she had received by means of this devotion, a large book would not contain them.

Gertrude

Gertrude the Great was an early devotee of the Sacred Heart of Jesus. Book 2 of the Herald of Divine Love vividly describes Gertrude's visions, which show a considerable elaboration on the hitherto ill-defined veneration of Christ's heart. Bernard articulated this in his commentary on the Song of Songs. The women of Helfta – Gertrude foremost, who surely knew Bernard's commentary, and to a somewhat lesser extent the two Mechthildes – experienced this devotion centrally in their mystical visions.

In the 16th century, the devotion passed from the domain of mysticism into that of Christian asceticism. It was established as a devotion with prayers already formulated and special exercises, found in the writings of Lanspergius (d. 1539) of the Carthusians of Cologne, the Benedictine Louis de Blois (d. 1566) Abbot of Liessies in Hainaut, John of Avila (d. 1569), and Francis de Sales (d. 1622).

The historical record from that time shows an early bringing to light of the devotion. Ascetic writers spoke of it, especially those of the Society of Jesus (Jesuits). The image of the Sacred Heart of Jesus was everywhere in evidence, largely due to the Franciscan devotion to the Five Wounds and to the Jesuits placing the image on the title-page of their books and on the walls of their churches.

The first to establish the theological basis for the devotion was Polish Jesuit Kasper Drużbicki (1590–1662) in his book  (The goal of hearts – Heart of Jesus). Not much later John Eudes wrote an office, and promoted a feast for it. John Eudes is regarded as "tireless apostle of the devotion of the Sacred Hearts", entitling him as 'Father', doctor and apostle of the liturgical cult of the hearts of Jesus and Mary.

Little by little, the devotion to the Sacred Hearts became distinct, and on 31 August 1670 the first feast of the Sacred Heart of Jesus was celebrated in the Grand Seminary of Rennes. Coutances followed suit on October 20, a day with which the Eudist feast was from then on to be connected. The feast soon spread to other dioceses, and the devotion was likewise adopted in various religious communities. It gradually came into contact with the devotion begun by Margaret Mary Alacoque at Paray-le-Monial, and the two merged.

Margaret Mary Alacoque

The most significant source for the devotion to the Sacred Heart in the form it is known today was Margaret Mary Alacoque (1647–1690), a nun of the Order of the Visitation of Holy Mary, who claimed to have received apparitions of Jesus Christ in the Burgundian French village of Paray-le-Monial, the first on 27 December 1673, the feast of Saint John the Evangelist, and the final one 18 months later, revealing the form of the devotion, the chief features being reception of Holy Communion on the first Friday of each month, Eucharistic adoration during a "Holy hour" on Thursdays, and the celebration of the Feast of the Sacred Heart. She said that in her vision she was instructed to spend an hour every Thursday night to meditate on Jesus' Agony in the Garden of Gethsemane.

 In probably June or July 1674, Alacoque claimed that Jesus requested to be honored under the figure of his heart, also saying that, when he appeared radiant with love, he asked for a devotion of expiatory love: frequent reception of Communion, especially on the first Friday of the month, and the observance of the Holy hour.
 During the octave of Corpus Christi in 1675, probably on June 16, the vision known as the "great apparition" reportedly took place, where Jesus said: "Behold the Heart that has so loved men.[...] Instead of gratitude I receive from the greater part (of humankind) only ingratitude," and asked Margaret Mary for a feast of reparation of the Friday after the octave of Corpus Christi, bidding her consult her confessor Claude de la Colombière, then superior of the small Jesuit house at Paray-le-Monial.

Sometime around 1681 Alacoque felt compelled to write a personal testament, passionately donating her life completely to Jesus with her own blood. With the permission of her superior she used a pocket knife to carve the name of Jesus into her breast and used the blood to sign the document. The following account recalls this event:

Upset by the fact that the wounds which she had cut into her breast were beginning to fade, she attempted to reopen the original wounds on more than one occasion using a knife. But, having failed to open them to her liking, she decided to burn her chest with fire. This incident placed her in the infirmary:

De la Colombière directed her to write an account of the apparition, which he discreetly circulated in France and England. After his death on 15 February 1682, his journal of spiritual retreats was found to contain a copy in his handwriting of the account that he had requested of Margaret Mary, together with a few reflections on the usefulness of the devotion. This journal, including the account – an "offering" to the Sacred Heart in which the devotion was explained – was published at Lyon in 1684. The little book was widely read, especially at Paray-le-Monial. Margaret Mary reported feeling "dreadful confusion" over the book's contents, but resolved to make the best of it, approving of the book for the spreading of her cherished devotion. Along with the Visitandines, priests, religious, and laymen espoused the devotion, particularly the Capuchins. The reported apparitions served as a catalyst for the promotion of the devotion to the Sacred Heart. Jesuit priest Croiset wrote a book called The Devotion to the Sacred Heart of Jesus, and Joseph de Gallifet promoted the devotion. The mission of propagating the new devotion was especially confided to the religious of the Visitation and to the priests of the Society of Jesus.

Estelle Faguette

On the night of 14 February 1876 a domestic servant Estelle Faguette lay in Pellevoisin dying of pulmonary tuberculosis, and reportedly saw the Virgin Mary. Four days later, during the fifth apparition, Estelle seemed to be healed instantaneously. Altogether she said she experienced fifteen apparitions in the course of 1876. Estelle sought and was granted an audience with the Archbishop of Bourges, Monsignor de La Tour d'Auvergne. By 12 December 1876 she had received his permission to make and distribute copies of the Scapular of the Sacred Heart.

Mary of the Divine Heart

Another source for the devotion to the Sacred Heart of Jesus was Mary of the Divine Heart (1863–1899), a religious sister from the Congregation of Our Lady of Charity of the Good Shepherd, who reported to have received several interior locutions and visions of Jesus Christ.

Based on the messages she said she received in her revelations of Christ, on 10 June 1898 her confessor at the Good Shepherd monastery wrote to Pope Leo XIII stating that Mary of the Divine Heart had received a message from Christ, requesting the pope to consecrate the entire world to the Sacred Heart. The pope initially attached no credence to it and took no action. However, on 6 January 1899 she sent another letter asking that in addition to the consecration, the first Fridays of the month be observed in honor of the Sacred Heart.

Mary of the Divine Heart died in her monastery in Portugal when the church was singing the first vespers of the Sacred Heart of Jesus on 8 June 1899. The following day, Pope Leo XIII consecrated the entire world to the Sacred Heart of Jesus.

Papal approval

In 1353, Pope Innocent VI instituted a Mass honoring the mystery of the Sacred Heart.

After the death of Margaret Mary Alacoque on 17 October 1690, a short account of her life was published by Croiset in 1691 as an appendix to his book De la Dévotion au Sacré Cœur. In 1693 the Holy See imparted indulgences to the Confraternities of the Sacred Heart, and in 1697 granted the feast to the Visitandines with the Mass of the Five Wounds, but refused a feast common to all, with special Mass and Office. The devotion spread, particularly in religious communities. The Marseille plague in 1720 furnished perhaps the first occasion for a solemn consecration and public worship outside of religious communities. Other cities of southern Europe followed the example of Marseille. In 1726 Rome was again asked for a feast with a Mass and Office of its own; this was refused in 1729, but granted in 1765. In that year, at the request of the queen, the feast was received quasi-officially by the episcopate of France. In 1856, at the urgent entreaties of the French bishops, Pope Pius IX extended the Feast of the Sacred Heart to the Latin Church under the rite of double major. In 1889 it was raised by the Latin Church to the double rite of first class. In 1928, Pope Pius XI raised the feast to the highest rank, double of the first class, and added an octave; the 1955 reforms of the General Roman calendar suppressed, among others, the octave of the Sacred Heart of Jesus.

After Pope Leo XIII received several letters from Mary of the Divine Heart asking him to consecrate the entire world to the Sacred Heart of Jesus, he commissioned a group of theologians to examine the petition on the basis of revelation and sacred tradition. The outcome of this investigation was positive, and so in the encyclical letter Annum sacrum (on 25 May 1899) he decreed that the consecration of the entire human race to the Sacred Heart of Jesus should take place on 11 June 1899. The encyclical letter also encouraged the entire Roman Catholic episcopate to promote the First Friday Devotions, established June as the Month of the Sacred Heart, and included the Prayer of Consecration to the Sacred Heart.

Pope Pius X decreed that the consecration of the human race performed by Leo XIII be renewed each year. Pius XI in his encyclical letter Miserentissimus Redemptor (on 8 May 1928) affirmed the church's position with respect to Margaret Mary Alacoque's visions of Jesus Christ by stating that Jesus had "manifested Himself" to Alacoque and had "promised her that all those who rendered this honor to his Heart would be endowed with an abundance of heavenly graces." The encyclical refers several times to the conversation between Jesus and Alacoque and reaffirmed the importance of consecration and reparation to the Sacred Heart of Jesus.

Pope Pius X also granted a Pontifical decree for the imposition of a golden crown to the lowly foot of a statue of the Sacred Heart of Jesus in the Nevers Cathedral on 9 July 1908 (via the Archbishop of Nevers and Besancon, Francois Leon Gauthey, both signed and notarized by the Sacred Congregation of Rites).

Pope Pius XII, on the occasion of the 100th anniversary of Pius IX's institution of the feast, instructed the entire Latin Church at length on the devotion to the Sacred Heart in his encyclical letter Haurietis aquas (on 15 May 1956). On 15 May 2006, Pope Benedict XVI sent a letter to Peter Hans Kolvenbach, the Superior General of the Society of Jesus, on the 50th anniversary of Haurietis aquas. In his letter to Kolvenbach, Pope Benedict XVI reaffirmed the importance of the devotion to the Sacred Heart of Jesus.

Worship and devotion

The Catholic acts of consecration, reparation, and devotion were introduced when the feast of the Sacred Heart was declared. In his papal bull Auctorem fidei, Pope Pius VI praised devotion to the Sacred Heart. Finally, Leo XIII in his encyclical Annum sacrum (25 May 1899), as well as on June 11, consecrated every human to the Sacred Heart. The idea of this act, which Leo XIII called "the great act" of his pontificate, had been proposed to him by Sister Mary of the Divine Heart from Oporto (Portugal) who said that she had supernaturally received it from Jesus. Since , groups, congregations, and countries have consecrated themselves to the Sacred Heart. In 1873, by petition of president Gabriel García Moreno, Ecuador was the first country in the world to be consecrated to the Sacred Heart.

Ireland was consecrated to the Sacred Heart on Passion Sunday 1873 by the bishops of Ireland, which led to the Sacred Heart lamp becoming a common devotional object in Irish homes.

Peter Coudrin of France founded the Congregation of the Sacred Hearts of Jesus and Mary on 24 December 1800. A religious order of the Latin Church, the order carried out missionary work in Hawaii.

Clelia Merloni from Forlì (Italy) founded the Congregation of the Apostles of the Sacred Heart of Jesus in Viareggio, Italy, on 30 May 1894.

Worship of the Sacred Heart mainly consists of several hymns, the Salutation of the Sacred Heart, and the Litany of the Sacred Heart. It is common in Roman Catholic services and occasionally is to be found in Anglican services.

The Feast of the Sacred Heart, in the Catholic liturgical calendar since the changes from 1969 in Mysterii Paschalis, is now categorized as a solemnity and is celebrated on the third Friday after Pentecost, which was up until the changes in the General Roman Calendar of Pope Pius XII referred to as the Friday after the octave of Corpus Christi.

The Enthronement of the Sacred Heart is a Roman Catholic ceremony in which a priest or head of a household consecrates the members of the household to the Sacred Heart. An image of the Sacred Heart that has been blessed, either a statue or a picture, is then placed in the home as a reminder. The practice of the Enthronement is based upon Pius XII's declaration that devotion to the Sacred Heart of Jesus is "the foundation on which to build the kingdom of God in the hearts of individuals, families, and nations."

In the Catholic tradition, the Sacred Heart has been closely associated with Acts of Reparation to Jesus Christ. In his encyclical Miserentissimus Redemptor, Pope Pius XI stated: "The spirit of expiation or reparation has always had the first and foremost place in the worship given to the Most Sacred Heart of Jesus." The Golden Arrow Prayer directly refers to the Sacred Heart.

Devotion to the Sacred Heart is sometimes seen in the Eastern Catholic Churches, where it remains a point of controversy and is seen as an example of liturgical Latinisation.

Feast day
The Feast of the Sacred Heart is a solemnity in the liturgical calendar of the Latin Church. It falls 19 days after Pentecost, on a Friday. Therefore, it is the last feast day of the year that is dependent on the date of Easter. The earliest possible date is 29 May, as in 1818 and 2285. The latest possible date is 2 July, as in 1943 and 2038. The devotion to the Sacred Heart is one of the most widely practiced and well-known Catholic devotions, taking Jesus Christ's physical heart as the representation of his divine love for humanity.

Alliance with the Immaculate Heart

The Alliance of the Hearts of Jesus and Mary is based on the historical, theological, and spiritual links in Catholic devotions between the Sacred Heart of Jesus and the Immaculate Heart of Mary. The joint devotion to the hearts was first formalized in the seventeenth century by John Eudes who organized the scriptural, theological, and liturgical sources relating to the devotions and obtained the approbation of the church, prior to the visions of Margaret Mary Alacoque.

In the eighteenth and nineteenth centuries the devotions grew, both jointly and individually, through the efforts of figures such as Louis de Montfort who promoted Catholic Mariology and Catherine Labouré's Miraculous Medal depicting the Heart of Jesus thorn-crowned and the Heart of Mary pierced with a sword. The devotions and associated prayers grew into the twentieth century, e.g. in the Immaculata prayer of Maximillian Kolbe and in the reported messages of Our Lady of Fátima saying that the Heart of Jesus wishes to be honored together with the Heart of Mary.

Popes supported the individual and joint devotions to the hearts through the centuries. In the 1956 encyclical Haurietis aquas, Pope Pius XII encouraged the joint devotion to the hearts. In the 1979 encyclical Redemptor hominis, Pope John Paul II explained the theme of unity of Mary's Immaculate Heart with the Sacred Heart. In his Angelus address on 15 September 1985, John Paul II coined the term The Alliance of the Hearts of Jesus and Mary, and in 1986 addressed the international conference on that topic held at Fátima, Portugal.

Names of institutions

Sacred Heart is a name used for many Catholic institutions, including schools, colleges, and hospitals in many countries. It is also the name of many Catholic parishes, religious orders, and stores selling Catholic religious goods.

Sacred Heart imagery 

The Sacred Heart has also been involved in and depicted in apparitions such as those to Catherine Labouré in 1830, and appears on the Miraculous Medal, where the Sacred Heart is crowned with thorns. The Immaculate Heart of Mary also appears on the medal, next to the Sacred Heart, but is pierced by a sword rather than being crowned with thorns. The M on the medal signifies the Blessed Virgin at the foot of the Cross when Jesus was being crucified.
The Carillon-Sacré-Coeur flag has been adopted by the Société Saint-Jean-Baptiste in Québec.
Religious imagery depicting the Sacred Heart is frequently featured in Catholic, and sometimes in Anglican and  homes. Sometimes images display beneath them a list of family members, indicating that the entire family is entrusted to the protection of Jesus in the Sacred Heart, from whom blessings on the home and the family members are sought. The prayer "O Sacred Heart of Jesus, I place all my trust in Thee" is often used. One particular image has been used as part of a set, along with an image of the Virgin Mary. In that image, Mary too was shown pointing to her Immaculate Heart. The dual images reflect an eternal binding of the two hearts.

During the month of June, which is traditionally devoted to the Sacred Heart, many observant Catholics have posted images of the Sacred Heart of Jesus on social media in opposition to pride month, which they consider to be a celebration of sin by corporations, politicians, government agencies and other secular institutions. The Scapular of the Sacred Heart and the Scapular of the Sacred Hearts of Jesus and Mary are worn by Catholics.

In Eastern Catholicism
Devotion to the Sacred Heart may be found in some Eastern Catholic Churches, but is a contentious issue. Those who favour purity of rite are opposed to the devotion, while those who are in favour of the devotion cite it as a point of commonality with their Latin Catholic brethren.

Promises of the Sacred Heart of Jesus

Made to Margaret Mary Alacoque
Margaret Mary Alacoque said that in her apparitions Jesus promised these blessings to those who practice devotion to his Sacred Heart. The list was tabulated in 1863. In 1882 an American businessman spread the tabular form of the twelve promises throughout the world, in 238 languages. In 1890 Cardinal Adolph Perraud deplored this circulation of the promises in tabular form, which he said were different from the words and the meaning of the expressions used by Alacoque, and wanted the promises to be published in their original words.

 I will give them all the graces necessary for their state of life.
 I will give peace in their families.
 I will console them in all their troubles.
 I will be their refuge in life and especially in death.
 I will abundantly bless all their undertakings.
 Sinners shall find in my Heart the source and infinite ocean of mercy.
 Tepid souls shall become fervent.
 Fervent souls shall rise speedily to great perfection.
 I will bless those places wherein the image of My Sacred Heart shall be exposed and venerated.
 I will give to priests the power to touch the most hardened hearts.
 Persons who propagate this devotion shall have their names eternally written in my Heart.
 In the excess of the mercy of my Heart, I promise you that my all powerful love will grant to all those who will receive Communion on the First Fridays, for nine consecutive months, the grace of final repentance: they will not die in my displeasure, nor without receiving the sacraments; and my Heart will be their secure refuge in that last hour.

On 16 June 1675, Margaret Mary Alacoque reports three specific requests for the temporal power, directly from his spiritual talks. These will have political and religious repercussions and will successively be realized under the regimes royal, imperial and republican French.

 The first message is addressed to kings : "He desires to enter pompously and magnificently into the house of princes and kings, to be honored, as much as he has been outraged, despised and humiliated in his passion … that the adorable Heart of his divine Son was received … to establish his empire in the heart of our Great Monarch, from which he wants to serve for the execution of his designs."
The second message is: "to build a building where the painting of this divine Heart will be, to receive the consecration and the homage of the King and of the whole court …"
 The third message asks the King: "to be painted on his standards and engraved on his weapons to make him victorious over all his enemies, by bringing down at his feet the proud and superb heads, in order to make him triumphant to all the enemies of the Holy Church".

By a law voted on 24 July 1873, the Basilica of the Sacred Heart of Montmartre known as National Vow, is declared of public utility by the National Assembly of 1871. On 16 June 1875, the Archbishop of Paris, Cardinal Guibert lay the first stone of the basilica, honoring after two hundred years the fourth request reported by Margaret Mary Alacoque from June 16, 1675.

Made to Mary of the Divine Heart

Mary of the Divine Heart said that in her mystical experiences Jesus Christ inspired her to build a shrine dedicated to his Sacred Heart. The imposing Church of the Sacred Heart of Jesus (also referred as Church of the Good Shepherd or Sanctuary of the Sacred Heart of Jesus) was built between 14 July 1957 and 21 April 1966, in the civil parish of Ermesinde in north Portugal, and consecrated to the Heart of Christ in fulfillment of the vow made by the nun. According to the writings of Sister Mary of the Divine Heart, Jesus had made this promise: "I will make it a place of graces. I will distribute copiously graces to all who live in this house [the Convent], those who live here now, those who will live here after, and even to their relatives." Jesus also promised her: "Know this, My daughter, that by the charity of My Heart I desire to pour out floods of graces through your heart over the hearts of others. This is why people will come to you with confidence; it will not be your personal qualities which will attract them, but Me. No one, even the most hardened sinner, will leave your presence without having received, in one way or another, consolation, relief, or a special grace."

The body of Mary of the Divine Heart, entombed for public veneration in the Church-Shrine of the Sacred Heart of Jesus in Ermesinde, was found incorrupt at its first exhumation.

Scapular of the Sacred Heart

The devotions to the Sacred Heart of Jesus also involve the Scapular of the Sacred Heart. Prior to the existence of a formal Catholic devotional scapular, Margaret Mary Alacoque made and distributed badges bearing an image of the Heart of Jesus. In 1872 Pope Pius IX granted an indulgence for the badge.

Following the claims by Estelle Faguette that the Virgin Mary had appeared to her at Pellevoisin in 1876 and requested a scapular of the Sacred Heart of Jesus, a scapular of the proposed design was approved by the Congregation of Rites in 1900. It bears the representation of the Sacred Heart of Jesus on one side and that of the Virgin Mary under the title of Mother of Mercy on the other side.

Criticism
Many Eastern Orthodox Christians disapprove of the actual worship of the physical heart of Jesus as being a form of naturalism and Nestorianism; the Feast of the Sacred Heart has however been inserted in certain Calendars of Western Rite Orthodoxy. Pope Pius XII's encyclical Haurietis aquas, in response to these criticisms, said that the Sacred Heart is venerated as belonging to the Divine Person of the Eternal Word and as "a symbolic image of his love and a witness of our redemption."

Gallery

Litany of the Sacred Heart of Jesus

V. Lord, have mercy on us.
R. Christ, have mercy on us.
V. Lord, have mercy on us. Christ, hear us.
R. Christ, graciously hear us.
V. God the Father of Heaven, have mercy on us.
God the Son, Redeemer of the world, have mercy on us.
God the Holy Spirit, have mercy on us.
Holy Trinity, one God, have mercy on us.
Heart of Jesus, Son of the Eternal Father, have mercy on us.
Heart of Jesus, formed in the womb of the Virgin Mother by the Holy Spirit, have mercy on us.
Heart of Jesus, united substantially to the Word of God.
Heart of Jesus, of infinite majesty.
Heart of Jesus, holy temple of God.
Heart of Jesus, tabernacle of the Most High.
Heart of Jesus, house of God and gate of heaven.
Heart of Jesus, glowing furnace of charity.
Heart of Jesus, vessel of justice and love.
Heart of Jesus, full of goodness and love.
Heart of Jesus, abyss of all virtues.
Heart of Jesus, most worthy of all praise.
Heart of Jesus, King and center of all hearts.
Heart of Jesus, in whom art all the treasures of wisdom and knowledge.
Heart of Jesus, in whom dwelleth all the fullness of the Godhead.
Heart of Jesus, in whom the Father was well pleased.
Heart of Jesus, of whose fullness we have all received.
Heart of Jesus, desire of the everlasting hills.
Heart of Jesus, patient and rich in mercy.
Heart of Jesus, rich to all who call upon Thee.
Heart of Jesus, fount of life and holiness.
Heart of Jesus, expiation for our offenses.
Heart of Jesus, overwhelmed with reproaches.
Heart of Jesus, bruised for our iniquities.
Heart of Jesus, obedient even unto death.
Heart of Jesus, pierced with a lance.
Heart of Jesus, source of all consolation.
Heart of Jesus, our life and resurrection.
Heart of Jesus, our peace and reconciliation.
Heart of Jesus, victim for our sins.
Heart of Jesus, salvation of those who hope in Thee.
Heart of Jesus, hope of those who die in Thee.
Heart of Jesus, delight of all saints.

V. Lamb of God, who takest away the sins of the world,
R. spare us, O Lord.
V. Lamb of God, who takest away the sins of the world,
R. graciously hear us, O Lord.
V. Lamb of God, who takest away the sins of the world,
R. have mercy on us.

V. Jesus, meek and humble of Heart,
R. Make our hearts like unto Thine.

Let us pray.

Almighty and everlasting God, look upon the Heart of Thy well-beloved Son and upon the acts of praise and satisfaction which he renders unto Thee in the name of sinners; and do Thou, in Thy great goodness, grant pardon to those who seek Thy mercy, in the name of the same Thy Son, Jesus Christ, who liveth and reigneth with Thee, world without end.

Enthronement of the Sacred Heart of Jesus

Act of enthroning the Sacred Heart in a home or other place
The enthronement is placing an image of the Sacred Heart of Jesus in a place of honor in the home after a time of prayerful preparation.
Many families will also place an image of the Immaculate Heart of Mary in tandem with the Sacred Heart image.
In some areas, there are lay apostolates dedicated to promoting and witnessing Enthronements.
Enthroning the Sacred Heart in a home should not be confused with the practice of having a priest (or other Christian minister) bless a home, which is customarily done when a family first occupies a new home, and is offered by a minister. The presence of a priest is not required for an Enthronement.

Spreading the devotion to the Sacred Heart of Jesus in the 20th century

R. Mateo Crawley-Boevey, Apostle of the Enthronement of the Sacred Heart
In 1907, R. Mateo Crawley-Boevey, a priest in the Congregation of the Sacred Hearts of Jesus and Mary, visited the apparition chapel in France, where Jesus had appeared numerous times to Margaret Mary Alacoque. Crawley-Boevey, sick and exhausted, was restored in health and vigor while contemplating the image of the Sacred Heart. There he conceived a plan to "conquer the world" for the Sacred Heart. He presented the idea of Enthroning the Sacred Heart in homes to his superiors and ultimately, to Pope Pius X, who "commanded" him to devote his life to this mission. Thus, Crawley-Boevey became known as the Apostle of Sacred Heart Enthronements.

The National Enthronement Center
The National Enthronement Center, located in Fairhaven, Massachusetts, has been working to spread the devotion of Enthroning the Sacred Heart of Jesus in homes throughout the United States of America since the mid-1960s. This organization received their Nihil Obstat and Imprimatur designation in 1962.

The Sacred Heart Apostolate

The Sacred Heart Apostolate, started by Gloria Anson, is based in Knoxville, Tennessee. The apostolate is available for leading parish missions to encourage devotion to the Sacred Heart of Jesus throughout the United States and around the world. The apostolate also encourages and facilitates enthronements to the Sacred Heart over families, parishes, businesses and other institutions.

Sacred Heart Columbus
Sacred Heart Columbus, located in Columbus, Ohio, is an Apostolic Organization of Priests, Deacons, and Laymen, and Laywomen dedicated to bringing the Sacred Heart of Jesus Christ into every home, school, and business in the Diocese of Columbus and the state of Ohio since 2010. The Sacred Heart Columbus apostolate conducts its ministry of Enthroning the Sacred Heart of Jesus in homes, schools, and businesses by way of Sacred Heart Missionaries. Missionaries are priests, deacons and/or laymen & laywomen who go in teams of 2 to homes, schools and businesses to assist, witness and facilitate the Enthronement process. Sacred Heart Columbus is part of the national Sacred Heart Enthronement Network.

Sacred Heart Enthronement Network
Sacred Heart Enthronement Network is a 501(c)(3) located in Columbus Ohio, that promotes the Sacred Heart devotion nationally. It offers a self-Enthronement kit that can be shipped in the mail with an easy to follow booklet. There is an outreach program to reach a wider audience and includes videos and resources.

See also
 Act of Consecration to the Sacred Heart of Jesus
 Act of Reparation to the Sacred Heart of Jesus
 Alliance of the Hearts of Jesus and Mary
 Annum sacrum
 Apostles of the Sacred Heart of Jesus
 Divine Mercy
 Immaculate Heart of Mary

References

Sources

 Chasle, Louis; Sister Mary of the Divine Heart Droste zu Vischering, religious of the Good Shepherd, 1863–1899. Burns & Oates, London, 1906.

Further reading

External links

 The Sacred Heart of Jesus in Catholic Tradition
 Biographic video about the Messenger of the Divine Heart 
 The Chaplet of the Sacred Heart
 John Croiset. Devotion to the Sacred Heart of Jesus
 The Life of Saint Margaret Mary in her own words.
 St. Therese of Lisieux and the Sacred Heart of Jesus
 Vitis Mystica, tr. Brownlow, W.R.Bernard. London, R.Washbourne, 1873
 Sacred Heart Altar in St Peter's Basilica

Catholic adoration of Jesus
Catholic theology and doctrine
Catholic art by subject
Christian symbols
Sacred Heart
Iconography of Jesus
Heart